Year 347 (CCCXLVII) was a common year starting on Thursday (link will display the full calendar) of the Julian calendar. At the time, it was known as the Year of the Consulship of Rufinus and Eusebius (or, less frequently, year 1100 Ab urbe condita). The denomination 347 for this year has been used since the early medieval period, when the Anno Domini calendar era became the prevalent method in Europe for naming years.

Events 
 By place 

 China 
 Li Shi, ruler of Cheng Han, fails in his attempt to halt a Jin expedition under Huan Wen. He flees to the capital Chengdu and surrenders his forces. Emperor Jin Mudi spares his life and makes him a marquess.   

 By topic 

 Religion 
 Council of Sardica: An attempt is made to resolve the Arian controversy, and  ground rules for bishops are laid down.
 The Council of Philippopolis is held as the result of Eastern bishops leaving the Council of Sardica. In Philippopolis (Bulgaria), they excommunicate Pope Julius, and as a result, the Arian controversy is perpetuated.

Births 
 January 11 – Theodosius I, Roman Emperor (d. 395)
 March 27 – Saint Jerome, priest and translator of the Bible (approximate date)
 Eunapius, Greek sophist and historian
 John Chrysostom, archbishop of Constantinople (approximate date)
 Paula, Desert Mother and Saint (d. 404)
 Saint Porphyry, bishop of Gaza (approximate date)

Deaths 
Ursicinus of Brescia, Bishop of Brescia

References